John Maginnes (born July 14, 1968) is an American professional golfer who played on the PGA Tour and the Nike Tour and is currently a golf analyst with his own show on Sirius XM Radio.

Playing career
Maginnes joined the Nike Tour in 1994. In 1995 he picked up his first win on Tour in at the Nike San Jose Open and also earned his PGA Tour card through qualifying school. In his rookie year on Tour he came close to winning the Buick Challenge but lost in a playoff to Michael Bradley. He finished 113th on the money list and retained his Tour card for the following year. He didn't play well enough in 1997 to retain his Tour card so he split time between the PGA and Nationwide Tour in 1998, picking up a victory at the Nike Dakota Dunes Open on the Nationwide Tour. He finished fifth on the money list that year, earning him his PGA Tour card for 1999. In 1999 he recorded four top-10 finishes en route to finishing 93rd on the money list, his best finish of his career. In 2000 he didn't do as well on Tour and played on the Buy.com Tour in 2001 where he won the Buy.com Carolina Classic. In 2002 he went through qualifying school for the second time to earn his PGA Tour card for 2003. He didn't have a good year on Tour and had to go through qualifying school for the third time to retain his Tour card. He injured his elbow in 2004 and played on a medical exemption in 2005, his final year on Tour.

Broadcasting career
While injured in 2004, Maginnes began to work as an on course commentator for the USA Network. In 2005 he began to work on XM Radio. He has worked for USA Network, Golf Channel, ESPN Digital, Sirius XM and many others. He co-hosts Katrek and Maginnes on Tap on SiriusXM Radio weeknights in the evening drive slot. The show previously known as Maginnes on Tap has aired since early 2011. Most recently, Maginnes has worked on PGA Tour Live primarily as an on-course commentator although he is occasionally utilized in the studio.

Professional wins (3)

Buy.com Tour wins (3)

Buy.com Tour playoff record (1–1)

Playoff record
PGA Tour playoff record (0–1)

Results in major championships

Note: The only major Maginnes played was the U.S. Open.

CUT = missed the half-way cut
"T" = tied

See also
1995 PGA Tour Qualifying School graduates
1998 Nike Tour graduates
2002 PGA Tour Qualifying School graduates
2003 PGA Tour Qualifying School graduates

References

External links

American male golfers
PGA Tour golfers
Golf writers and broadcasters
Korn Ferry Tour graduates
Golfers from Atlanta
East Carolina University alumni
1968 births
Living people